Lawrence Joseph Freund  (July 5, 1875 – November 5, 1933), was a Major League Baseball catcher for the Louisville Colonels during the 1896 season.

External links 

1875 births
1933 deaths
Major League Baseball catchers
Baseball players from Indiana
Louisville Colonels players
19th-century baseball players
Henderson (minor league baseball) players
Hopkinsville (minor league baseball) players
Springfield Governors players
Asheville Moonshiners players